Guila Alvarez is a Filipino former actor.

Personal life 

Alvarez's brothers are actors Gio Alvarez and Luigi Alvarez.

Alvarez is married to Ping Bautista, together they have four children.

Filmography

Television

Film

Awards and nominations

Notes

References

External links 
 

Living people
Filipino film actresses
Year of birth missing (living people)
Place of birth missing (living people)